Göran Fredrik Bundy (10 June 1921 – 8 August 2018) was a Swedish diplomat.

Early life
Bundy was born on 10 June 1921 in Malmö, Sweden, the son of Håkan Bundy and his wife Märta (née Thorell). When he was two-year-old Bundy suffered from polio - infantile paralysis. Then there was still no vaccine. He was lucky, a nerve in one calf was infected, while a two-year girl in his circle of friends, who also had the disease, died.

Career
Bundy received a Candidate of Law degree from Lund University in 1946 and served at the Ministry for Foreign Affairs in 1948 and 1953. Bundy served in Prague in 1949, Paris in 1950, Canberra in 1957, Cairo in 1958 and Tehran in 1960. He was first secretary at the Foreign Ministry in 1960, director in 1963 and the acting chargé d'affaires in Nicosia in 1964. Bundy was commercial counsellor at the embassy in Washington, D.C. in 1965, deputy director at the Foreign Ministry in 1971 and embassy counsellor in Helsinki in 1972. He was ambassador in Kuwait City, Doha, Manama and Abu Dhabi from 1977 to 1980 and in Tehran from 1980 to 1985. Bundy served in the Foreign Ministry in Stockholm from 1985 to 1986.

Personal life
After retiring, Bundy lived in London for 25 years before moving back home to Scania, Sweden. Bundy married late in life to Margaretha Grind, a doctor, a specialist in internal medicine and for many years tied to the pharmaceutical company AstraZeneca. In 2013, together with his sister Eva, Bundy founded the Eva and Göran Bundy's Foundation in support of medical research at Lund University to support research in cardiology and neurology. Together they have donated SEK 60 million ($6,52 million) to the foundation.

References

1921 births
2018 deaths
Ambassadors of Sweden to Kuwait
Ambassadors of Sweden to Qatar
Ambassadors of Sweden to Bahrain
Ambassadors of Sweden to the United Arab Emirates
Ambassadors of Sweden to Iran
Lund University alumni
Swedish expatriates in Czechoslovakia
Swedish expatriates in France
Swedish expatriates in Australia
Swedish expatriates in Egypt
Swedish expatriates in Cyprus
Swedish expatriates in Finland
Swedish expatriates in the United States
Swedish expatriates in the United Kingdom
People from Malmö